Luis Aceves Castañeda (1913–1973) was a Mexican film actor.

Selected filmography 
 Juan Charrasqueado (1948)
 Philip of Jesus (1949)
 Maria Islands (1951)
 A Place Near Heaven (1952)
 Mexican Bus Ride (1952)
 Wuthering Heights (1954)
 The Aztec Mummy (1957)
 The Curse of the Aztec Mummy (1957)
 Nazarín (1959)

References

Bibliography 
 Paietta, Ann C. Saints, Clergy and Other Religious Figures on Film and Television, 1895–2003. McFarland, 2005.

External links 
 

1913 births
1973 deaths
Mexican male film actors